José Vieira may refer to:

 José Vieira (rower) (born 1932), Portuguese rower
 José Luandino Vieira (born 1935), Angolan writer
 José Macedo Vieira (born 1949), president of the city council of Póvoa de Varzim
 José Vieira Alvernaz (1898–1986), Portuguese prelate
 José Vieira Filho (born 1992), Brazilian footballer
 José Vieira Couto de Magalhães (1837–1898), Brazilian politician